Charles Walter Greene (1849-1926) was the first teacher of agriculture at Tuskegee Institute and the second head of the Agriculture Department at Tuskegee. He was a graduate of Hampton Institute and classmate of Booker T. Washington. He took over as Tuskegee Institute's farm manager in June 1888. The school had mostly trained teachers up until then. George Washington Carver was recruited to the Agriculture faculty in 1896.

Greene was born in Gatesville, North Carolina in 1849. Although several years older, Greene was a classmate, friend, and roommate of Booker T. Washington at Hampton Institute. Each had a prominent role in the program for their graduation in 1875.

Greene traveled to rural areas to talk about agricultural practices, preceding the development of extension services for Black farmers. Before the turn of the century, Washington instructed Greene to acquire property to develop a village area that would be entirely owned and operated by "Negroes" and demonstrate their capability and establish economic independence. The district was formally designated in 1901 and named Greenwood, entirely apart from the school. Following Washington's 1905 visit to Arkansas, Indian Territory and Oklahoma, and his speech in Tulsa suggesting the Tuskegee Greenwood District as an example of what he was recommending, Tulsa named its Negro-owned district Greenwood in 1906. In 1940, a plaque at Tuskegee Institute was unveiled to commemorate Greene's service.

He wore a bowtie and glasses. William James Edwards was one of his students. William Henry Holtzclaw also studied under him before moving on to the printing department. Martin A. Menafee also worked on the farm. George Washington Carver was recruited to work in the Agriculture Department in 1896.

References

Tuskegee University faculty
Hampton University alumni
Academics from North Carolina

1849 births
Date of death unknown
People from Gatesville, North Carolina